Waipatukahu is a locality west of Auckland, in New Zealand. It surrounds Waipatukahu Stream, which flows north-north-east from Lake Paekawau, draining the Waimauku Plateau and the Western Sand Country and joins the Kaipara River.

Demographics
The statistical area of Waipatukahu extends west to the Tasman Sea, and slightly further east than Waimauku. It includes Woodhill but doesn't include Waimauku or Muriwai.

Waipatukahu had a population of 1,461 at the 2018 New Zealand census, an increase of 222 people (17.9%) since the 2013 census, and an increase of 273 people (23.0%) since the 2006 census. There were 471 households, comprising 732 males and 732 females, giving a sex ratio of 1.0 males per female. The median age was 40.1 years (compared with 37.4 years nationally), with 327 people (22.4%) aged under 15 years, 261 (17.9%) aged 15 to 29, 723 (49.5%) aged 30 to 64, and 150 (10.3%) aged 65 or older.

Ethnicities were 90.1% European/Pākehā, 16.6% Māori, 3.5% Pacific peoples, 2.1% Asian, and 1.8% other ethnicities. People may identify with more than one ethnicity.

The percentage of people born overseas was 19.3, compared with 27.1% nationally.

Although some people chose not to answer the census's question about religious affiliation, 57.9% had no religion, 29.0% were Christian, 2.1% had Māori religious beliefs, 0.8% were Hindu, 0.2% were Buddhist and 2.1% had other religions.

Of those at least 15 years old, 231 (20.4%) people had a bachelor's or higher degree, and 165 (14.6%) people had no formal qualifications. The median income was $40,500, compared with $31,800 nationally. 285 people (25.1%) earned over $70,000 compared to 17.2% nationally. The employment status of those at least 15 was that 612 (54.0%) people were employed full-time, 210 (18.5%) were part-time, and 36 (3.2%) were unemployed.

Notes

Populated places in the Auckland Region
Rodney Local Board Area
West Auckland, New Zealand